The European Physical Society (EPS) is a non-profit organisation whose purpose is to promote physics and physicists in Europe through methods such as physics outreach. Formally established in 1968, its membership includes the national physical societies of 42 countries, and some 3200 individual members. The Deutsche Physikalische Gesellschaft, the world's largest and oldest organisation of physicists, is a major member.

Conferences
One of its main activities is organizing international conferences.

The EPS sponsors conferences other than the Europhysics Conference, like the International Conference of Physics Students in 2011.

Divisions and groups

The scientific activities of EPS are organised through Divisions and Groups, who organise topical conferences, seminars, and workshops. The Divisions and Groups are governed by boards elected from members. The current Divisions of the EPS are:
 Atomic, Molecular and Optical Physics Division
 Condensed Matter Division
 Environmental Physics Division
 Gravitational Physics Division
 High Energy Particle Physics Division
 Nuclear Physics Division
 Division of Physics in Life Sciences
 Physics Education Division
 Plasma Physics Division
 Quantum Electronics and Optics Division
 European Solar Physics Division
 Statistical & Nonlinear Physics Division

And the current Groups of the EPS are:
 Accelerator Group
 Computational Physics Group
 Energy Group
 History of Physics Group
 Physics for Development Group
 Technology and Innovation Group

Prizes
The EPS awards a number of prizes, including the Edison Volta Prize, the EPS Europhysics Prize, the EPS Statistical and Nonlinear Physics Prizes, the High Energy and Particle Physics Prize and the Rolf Wideroe Prize.

It also recognises sites which are historically important for advances to physics, such as the Blackett Laboratory (UK) in 2014, and the Residencia de Estudiantes (Spain) in 2015.

Publications
Its letters journal is EPL; its other publications include Europhysics News and the European Journal of Physics.

Presidents

2021–present: Luc Bergé (France)
2019–2021: Petra Rudolf (The Netherlands) 
2017–19: Rüdiger Voss (Switzerland)
2015–17: C. Rossel (Switzerland)
2013–15: John M. Dudley (France)
2011–13: Luisa Cifarelli (Italy)
2009–11: M. Kolwas (Poland)
2007–9: Friedrich Wagner (Germany)
2005–7: O. Poulsen (Denmark)
2003–5: M.C.E. Huber (Switzerland)
2001–3: M. Ducloy (France)
1999–2001: Arnold Wolfendale (United Kingdom)
1997–99: Denis Weaire (Ireland)
1995–97: Herwig Schopper (Germany)
1993–95: N. Kroo (Hungary)
1991–93: Maurice Jacob (Switzerland)
1988–91: R.A. Ricci (Italy)
1986–88: W. Buckel (Germany)
1984–86: G.H. Stafford (United Kingdom)
1982–84: Jacques Friedel (France)
1980–82: A.R. Mackintosh (Denmark)
1978–80: Antonino Zichichi (Italy)
1976–78: I. Ursu (Romania)
1972–76: H.B.G. Casimir (The Netherlands)
1970–72: Erik Gustav Rydberg (Sweden)
1968–70: Gilberto Bernardini (Italy)

References

External links
 

Physics societies
International scientific organizations based in Europe
Scientific organizations established in 1968
1968 establishments in Europe